Molly Cameron (born August 28, 1976) is an American professional cyclo-cross racing cyclist who rides for Portland Bicycle Studio. She was the first openly transgender (MTF= Male to Female) athlete to compete in a (Men's Category) UCI Cyclo-cross World Cup, and is an acknowledged vegan athlete.

Cameron won the 2004 Cross Crusade singlespeed series and has been racing at a pro level ever since. She has competed in cyclo-cross races in the US and Europe at the elite racer level.

Cameron has long identified as a woman, but has raced in the elite men's scene since 2008. Because Molly does not restrict her male-born testosterone, she is ineligible to race in elite women's events.

References

External links 

 
 Official OBRA Results 2005-present
 

American female cyclists
People from Wichita Falls, Texas
1976 births
Living people
21st-century American women